Choodikotta is an enclave in the Mahe district of Puducherry and a part of the Mahé municipality.

References 
 

Mahe district